Alby Saunders (born 1924) was an Australian racing cyclist.

Career highlights

1947
Fastest Tour of Gippsland 
1949
1st Australian national road race title
Blue Riband for fastest in the Melbourne to Warrnambool Classic 
4th General Classification Tour of the West
1950 
8th General Classification Tour of the West 
1951 
9th General Classification Tour of the West
1952 
3rd Stage 1 'Sun' Tour of Victoria, Geelong
2nd Stage 2 'Sun' Tour of Victoria, Bendigo
3rd Stage 3 'Sun' Tour of Victoria Cobram
1st Stage 4 'Sun' Tour of Victoria,  Melbourne
8th General Classification 'Sun' Tour of Victoria
1953
1st Australian national road race title 
Blue Riband for fastest in the Melbourne to Warrnambool Classic

Australian professional cycling career

Saunders won the Blue Riband for the fastest time in the Melbourne to Warrnambool in 1949 and 1953.

In 2010 the Footscray cycling club held an Alby Saunders Memorial criterium.

References

External links

1924 births
Place of birth missing
Year of death missing
Place of death missing
Australian male cyclists